John Ennis Vivian (1787 – 24 May 1870) was a British Conservative politician.

Vivian was first elected as the Conservative MP for Truro at the 1835 general election and held the seat for 22 years, standing down at the 1857 general election.

References

External links
 

1870 deaths
1787 births
Conservative Party (UK) MPs for English constituencies
UK MPs 1835–1837
UK MPs 1837–1841
UK MPs 1841–1847
UK MPs 1847–1852
UK MPs 1852–1857
Members of the Parliament of the United Kingdom for Truro